Kurgjärv is a lake of Estonia.

See also
List of lakes of Estonia

Lakes of Estonia
Rõuge Parish
Lakes of Võru County
Tourist attractions in Võru County

References